Bogura Cantonment Public School & College is a school and college in Shahjahanpur Upazila, Bogura, Rajshahi, Bangladesh. It was established in 1979 by President of Bangladesh Ziaur Rahman.

As of 2014, it has a student body of 2605. It was identified  as one of the top twenty institutions in the Rajshahi Education Board district.  The Chief Patron of the school and college is Major General Nazmul Hasan, General Officer Commanding of the 11th infantry division of the Bangladesh Army, who has described it as "the premier educational institution of excellence in North Bengal."

References

External links
 

Buildings and structures in Rajshahi Division
Schools in Bogra District
Educational Institutions affiliated with Bangladesh Army